Bwile is a divergent Bantu language of Zambia and DR Congo.

References

 
Sabi languages
Languages of Zambia
Languages of Namibia
Languages of the Democratic Republic of the Congo